Arthur Asahel Shurcliff (1870–1957) was a noted American landscape architect. Born Arthur Asahel Shurtleff, he changed his last name in 1930 in order, he said, to conform to the "ancient spelling of the family name". After over 30 years of success as a practicing landscape architect and town planner, in 1928 he was called upon by John D. Rockefeller Jr., and the Boston architectural firm of Perry, Shaw & Hepburn to serve as Chief Landscape Architect for the restoration and recreation of the gardens, landscape, and town planning of Colonial Williamsburg, Virginia, a position he held until his retirement in 1941.  It was the largest and most important commission of his career.

Shurcliff was born in Boston, Massachusetts, studied engineering at the Massachusetts Institute of Technology (1889–1894), and upon the advice of Charles Eliot and Frederick Law Olmsted, enrolled at Harvard University for studies in art history, surveying, horticulture and design. After his graduation in 1896, he joined Olmsted's Brookline landscape architecture firm. In 1899, he aided Frederick Law Olmsted Jr. in founding America's first four-year landscape architecture school at Harvard University. He set up his own Boston practice in 1904. The following year, 1905, he married Margaret Homer Nichols, with whom he had six children. An early member of the American Society of Landscape Architects he later served two terms as its president(1928–1932).

In addition to the gardens, landscapes, and town planning of Colonial Williamsburg, his better known public works include the laying out of Old Sturbridge Village, the Charles River Esplanade, the redesign of Frederick Law Olmsted's Back Bay Fens and the zoological park at Franklin Park, all three in Boston. He served as a consultant to the Boston Parks Department, the Metropolitan District Commission and the Metropolitan Planning Board.  More Boston works include the Paul Revere Mall (also called The Prado) in the North End, and the John Harvard Mall in Charlestown, both located along the Freedom Trail. Among numerous private commissions are included Carter's Grove and Wilton House Museum in Virginia, Greatwood Gardens at Goddard College, Plainfield, Vermont; the Wells brothers' estates at Sturbridge, Massachusetts (creators and funders of Old Sturbridge Village); the Brookview-Irvington Park, Lafayette Place, and Wildwood Park communities in Fort Wayne, Indiana; and the Richard Crane estate at Ipswich, Massachusetts.

Personal life 
His wife, Margaret Homer Shurcliff (née Nichols), was the great, great, great-granddaughter of Thomas Johnson.  Her son Sidney was born in 1906.

External links
 Wildwood Park Community Association, Fort Wayne, Indiana 
 
 Fairfield University: Arthur Asahel Shurcliff (1870-1957)
 Mass. Historical Society - Arthur Asahel Shurcliff Papers
 Papers of the Nichols-Shurtleff family, 1780-1953. Schlesinger Library, Radcliffe Institute, Harvard University.

Fuller Gardens in NH

References

Bibliography 
Cushing, Elizabeth Hope. Arthur A. Shurcliff: Design, Preservation, and the Creation of the Colonial Williamsburg Landscape. 2014. Amherst, MA: Library of American Landscape History and University of Massachusetts Press.

1865 births
1957 deaths
American landscape architects
Architects from Boston
Harvard University alumni
Preservationist architects
American designers
MIT School of Engineering alumni